Arthur Barclay (1854–1938) was the 15th president of Liberia.

Arthur Barclay also may refer to:

Arthur Barclay (American politician) (born 1989), American basketball player and politician
Arthur Kett Barclay (1806–1869), English astronomer

See also
 Arthur Cecil Stuart Barkly, British colonial governor and judge